The Twante Canal is a canal that connects the Irrawaddy River and the Yangon river in Myanmar. The  canal is a heavily used short cut between the city of Yangon and the Irrawaddy Division. The canal is named after the town of Twante, located near the canal's mid-way point. The canal was the quickest route from Yangon to the Irrawaddy Delta until the 1990s when roads between Yangon and the Irrawaddy Division became usable year round. The canal is still heavily used.

Due to the lack of regular maintenance, the canal has become silted and narrower over the years. However, plans to put in concrete embankments were yet to be carried out, and the navigation problems still remain. Twante Bridge is only bridge that spans the Twante Canal

History
The construction work on Twante Canal began in 1903 during the British colonial rule. The canal was completed in 1915. The Twante Canal shortened the distance by the Kanaungto creek between Yangon and the Irrawaddy river. The Irrawaddy Flotilla Company, Ltd., which handled nearly all inland carrier traffic in British Burma, ran daily services from Yangon to the Irrawaddy delta and Upper Burma. In 1935, the canal was widened and deepened to allow for the Irrawaddy Flotilla Company's large steamers to Mandalay. Previously larger steam ships had to go out the Yangon river and up one of the larger mouths of the Irrawaddy.

References

Yangon Region
Canals in Myanmar
Canals opened in 1883